Albin Mikulski (born 3 January 1957) is a Polish football midfielder and later manager.

References

1957 births
Living people
Polish footballers
Association football midfielders
Avia Świdnik players
Stal Stalowa Wola players
Ruch Chorzów players
Ekstraklasa players
I liga players
Polish expatriate footballers
Expatriate soccer players in Australia
Polish expatriate sportspeople in Australia
Polish football managers
Odra Wodzisław Śląski managers
Odra Opole managers
Pogoń Szczecin managers
Wisła Płock managers
Polonia Warsaw managers
MKS Cracovia managers
Stal Stalowa Wola managers
Hutnik Nowa Huta managers
People from Przeworsk County